The name Institute for Advanced Study or sometimes Institute of Advanced Studies is used by various research institutions around the world.  They include:

Members of the consortium Some Institutes for Advanced Study (SIAS)
 Institute for Advanced Study in Princeton, New Jersey
 Radcliffe Institute for Advanced Study in Cambridge, Massachusetts
 Netherlands Institute for Advanced Study in Amsterdam, the Netherlands
 Berlin Institute for Advanced Study in Berlin, Germany
 Israel Institute for Advanced Studies in Jerusalem, Israel
 Nantes Institute for Advanced Study Foundation in Nantes, France
 Swedish Collegium for Advanced Study in Uppsala, Sweden

Institutions using Institute for Advanced Study
 Dublin Institute for Advanced Studies in Dublin, Ireland
 European Institute for Advanced Studies in Management in Brussels, Belgium
 Frankfurt Institute for Advanced Studies in Frankfurt, Germany
 Freiburg Institute for Advanced Studies in Freiburg, Germany
 Hong Kong Institute for Advanced Study, City University of Hong Kong
 HKUST Jockey Club Institute for Advanced Study in Hong Kong
 IMT Institute for Advanced Studies Lucca in Lucca, Italy
 Lichtenberg-Kolleg Institute for Advanced Study housed in Göttingen Observatory
 Institut des Hautes Études Scientifiques in Bures-sur-Yvette (near Paris), France
 Institute for Advanced Study at University of Minnesota in Minneapolis, Minnesota
 Institute for Advanced Studies in Basic Sciences in Zanjan, Iran
 Institute for Advanced Studies in the Humanities at the University of Edinburgh
 Institute for Advanced Study of Human Sexuality in San Francisco, California
 Institute for Advanced Study, Tsinghua University in Beijing, China
 Institute for Advanced Studies (Vienna) in Vienna, Austria
 International Institute for Advanced Studies in Systems Research and Cybernetics in Baden-Baden, Germany
 Johannesburg Institute for Advanced Study (JIAS) in Johannesburg, South Africa
 Korea Institute for Advanced Study in Seoul, Korea
 Krasnow Institute for Advanced Study in Fairfax, Virginia
 Libyan Institute for Advanced Studies in Tripoli, Bayda, and Tobruk, Libya
 Peter Wall Institute for Advanced Studies in British Columbia, Canada 
 Ramanujan Institute for Advanced Study in Mathematics in Chennai, India
 Research Institute for Advanced Studies in Baltimore, Maryland
 Texas A&M University Institute for Advanced Study in College Station, Texas
 TUM Institute for Advanced Study in Garching, Germany

Institutions using Institute of Advanced Study
 Adventist International Institute of Advanced Studies in Silang, Cavite, Philippines
 Institute of Advanced Legal Studies in London, England
 Institute of Advanced Studies in Education in Rajasthan, India
 Institute of Advanced Study (Durham) in Durham, North East England
 National Institute of Advanced Studies in Bengaluru, Karnataka, India
 Institute of Advanced Studies in Kőszeg, Hungary

See also
 IAS (disambiguation)